Erika de Vasconcelos (born 1965) is a Portuguese Canadian novelist.

Biography
Born in 1965 in Montreal to immigrants from Portugal, de Vasconcelos has one sister, Paula, now a theatrical director. A graduate of Marianopolis College, with a degree in English  and Art History from McGill University, as well as a degree in Interior Design, she began writing in her 30s after her 10th class reunion at her former high school, Villa Maria. Her first novel, My Darling Dead Ones, was published in 1997 by Knopf Canada, and was subsequently translated into Portuguese, Dutch and German. Her second novel   Between the Stillness and the Grove was published by Knopf Canada 2000 and also translated. She has also published stories/articles in several magazines, including Toronto Life, Quill and Quire, Chatelaine, House and Home, and The Globe and Mail. De Vasconcelos has also served on Juries for the Canada Council for the Arts, as well as the QSPELL Awards in Montreal.

De Vasconcelos has two daughters and one son, and is married to author Nino Ricci. She lives in Toronto.

Books by this author
Between the Stillness and the Grove (Knopf Canada, 2000)
My Darling Dead Ones (Knopf Canada, 1997) - this title was published in the New Face of Fiction program.

References

External links
https://web.archive.org/web/20110706202517/http://www.randomhouse.ca/author/results.pperl?authorid=60710
https://web.archive.org/web/20110714055945/http://www.mcdermidagency.com/authInfo.cfm?auth=76&userID=6
http://www.montrealmirror.com/ARCHIVES/1997/052997/art1.html
https://web.archive.org/web/20110126152535/http://repositorioaberto.univ-ab.pt/handle/10400.2/545

20th-century Canadian novelists
21st-century Canadian novelists
Canadian women novelists
Canadian people of Portuguese descent
Living people
1965 births
Canadian women short story writers
20th-century Canadian women writers
21st-century Canadian women writers
21st-century Canadian short story writers
20th-century Canadian short story writers